Luis Kutner (June 9, 1908 – March 1, 1993), was a US human rights activist, FBI informant and lawyer who was on the National Advisory Council of the US branch of Amnesty International during its early years and created the concept of a living will. He was also notable for his advocacy of "world habeas corpus", the development of an international writ of habeas corpus to protect individual human rights. He was a founder of World Habeas Corpus, an organization created to fight for international policies which would protect individuals against unwarranted imprisonment. Kutner's papers are at the Hoover Institution Archives at Stanford University.

Biography 
Luis Kutner was born in Chicago to Jewish-Russian immigrants. At the age of 15, he entered the law school of the University of Chicago.
 
During the late 1940s, Kutner built up his reputation as a human rights lawyer.
During his career he also gained the release of over 1,000 people, mainly as they were wrongfully convicted or being held without charge.

Kutner gained national recognition in 1949, when he obtained freedom for a black mechanic from Waukegan, Illinois, James Montgomery, who had served 26 years of a life term sentence for raping an itinerant. A Federal judge described as "a sham" the defendant's 1924 trial in which a vengeful prosecutor withheld vital evidence. He also helped free Hungarian Cardinal József Mindszenty, American fascist poet Ezra Pound, former Congo President Moise Tshombe and represented the Dalai Lama and Tibet. Kutner is widely known as one of the most prominent human-rights attorneys of the twentieth century.

He is also accredited for the first acknowledged federal lawsuit against a prison warden by inmates in 1949. In 1952, Kutner filed a lawsuit on behalf of a Black passenger against Illinois Greyhound Lines, four years prior to the federal Montgomery bus lawsuit Browder v. Gayle.

In 1966, Kutner participated in a lawsuit against George Lincoln Rockwell and the American Nazi Party.

Intelligence service 

Declassified records show that Kutner had a history of collusion with the FBI and the CIA. In 1969, he reported Fred Hampton to the FBI in the days leading to Hampton's death at the hands of the Chicago Police. In 1973, he petitioned the CIA for $250k to set up an NGO in Beijing, in return letting the agency "staff it completely with our own people."

Biographical Chronology
1927	J.D., University of Chicago Law School
1930	Admitted to Bar, State of Illinois
1944	Author, The Admiral (biography of George Dewey) (with Laurin Healy)
1948	Author, Fights and Cascades, Moon Splashed, Red Wine and Shadows (poems)
1953	Author, Live in Twelve Minutes (novel) (with W. T. Brannon)
1957	Author, The International Court of Habeas Corpus and the United Nations Writ of Habeas Corpus
1958	Author, World Habeas Corpus: A Proposal for International Court of Habeas Corpus and the United Nations Writ of Habeas Corpus
1961	Co-founded Amnesty International (with Peter Benenson)
1962	Author, World Habeas Corpus
1966	Author, I, the Lawyer
1967	Wrote the first living will
1970	Author, Legal Aspects of Charitable Trusts and Foundations: A Guide for Philanthropoids, The Intelligent Women's Guide to Future Security, also published as How to Be a Wise Widow
1970 	Editor, The Human Right to Individual Freedom: A Symposium on World Habeas to Corpus
1972	U.S. congressional nominee for the Nobel Peace Prize
1974	Author, Due Process of Rebellion, How to Be a Wise Widow, and The Trialle of William Shakespeare (three-act play)

Author of living will 
Luis Kutner was the first to publish the concept of the living will (which is the oldest form of an advance directive) in 1969. The term living will means that this form of will was to be used while an individual was still alive (but no longer able to make decisions). The term first occurs in the Luis Kutner Papers in a letter of November 15, 1967, in the context of Kutner’s correspondence with the Euthanasia Society of America. Kutner had first addressed the Euthanasia Society in August 1967 in connection with his plans to prepare an international symposium on Euthanasia (“Pro and Con”) which however was never materialized. On December 7, 1967, Kutner hold a speech on “Euthanasia and Due Process of Law” at the Euthanasia Society’s Annual Meeting in New York City. By that time, Kutner’s paper “Due Process of Euthanasia: The Living Will, A Proposal” was ready to be published, but publication was delayed until summer 1969 due to difficulties to find a publisher. In this paper, Kutner showed some sympathy with the propagators of “death on request” (active euthanasia), but stressed that a living will “authorizing mercy killing” would be “contrary to public policy”. Subsequently, Kutner published four more articles about the topic, in which he followed the same line of argumentation. For example, in 1987 he wrote in the University of Detroit Law Review: “The Living Will is a means for the individual to manage his death by protective guidelines and is premised on the informed consent of the person prior to an irreversible coma or a state of being disabled or maimed. It is based on the right of privacy – the individual’s right to self-determination of his body”. The Euthanasia Society of America adopted Kutner's idea and devised a living will document which was distributed among members by the affiliate charity society Euthanasia Educational Fund (which became Euthanasia Educational Council in 1972 and Concern for Dying in 1978). Kutner probably never became a member of the Euthanasia Society of America or one of its successor organisations, and his later attempts to cooperate with them failed.

Garry Davis case

When the French government indicted World Citizen Garry Davis on June 8, 1971 for issuing the World Passport from his home in Hesinque, Haut-Rhin, he engaged Dr. Luis Kutner as counsel during the trial at Mulhouse, H.R.

Following the trial, on June 10, 1971, Davis called a General Assembly of delegates of the World Government of World Citizens at Novetal, Sausheim, H.R. to declare the founding of the World Court of Human Rights, based on the Universal Declaration of Human Rights, articles 6 to 11. He appointed Luis Kutner as "Chief Justice." (See Kutner's acceptance speech below).

Kutner's Commission subsequently wrote the Statute for the Court for Due Process of International Law.

A test of the new court's efficacy was demonstrated in the case of Dennis Cecil Hills, the British Author, residing in Uganda during Idi Amin's presidency, who was scheduled to die by firing squad on June 26, 1975, for having written of the president as a "village tyrant" and therefore subsequently condemned as an "enemy of the state."

On Friday, June 23, Davis from Strasbourg, France sent the following telegram to Chief Justice Kutner in Chicago: "IN THE NAME OF THE COORDINATING COMMITTEE OF WORLD GOVERNMENT, I HEREBY REQUEST WORLD COURT OF HUMAN RIGHTS ISSUE WRIT OF HABEAS CORPUS AGAINST IDI AMIN ON BEHALF OF CECIL HILL STOP."

Chief Justice Kutner forwarded the following cable to His Excellency Idi Amin at Kampala, Uganda:
At the request of World Government of world citizens in Basel, Switzerland, and the commission for international due process of law and the world court of human rights, I am invoking your excellency to accept the herein telegraphed writ of world habeas corpus in behalf of your detainee Cecil Hill, consistent with Uganda's sovereign status as a member of the United Nations voluntarily assuming the human rights obligations of the charter, universal declaration of human rights, and other protocols and conventions guaranteeing the sanctity and integrity of human beings in global society of civilized nations dedicated to human dignity and standards of due process of law, respectfully,

Luis Kutner
world chairman
commission international
due process of law
world court of human rights

Mr. Sam Msubuga, legal advisor of the Chargé d'Affaires of the Uganda Embassy in Washington informed Kutner on Monday, June 26, of the reception of the telegraphed writ, was willing to comply and wished to "negotiate" Dennis Hill's release. Kutner informed the legal advisor the matter was strictly judicial not diplomatic and that, "If the defendant was not released forthwith, this Court will issue a Show Cause Order to which the President will have thirty days to reply."

At 5 p.m., Uganda time, Cecil Hill was released from detention.

On July 27, 2011, The World Court of Human Rights was declared de juris by World Citizen Garry Davis from the War Memorial Opera House from where the United Nations was declared over 66 years prior.

Dr. Luis Kutner's acceptance speech as the Chief Justice of the World Court of Human Rights:

I am indeed honored by this appointment which I accept in all humility.
The international community has come to realize that human rights are not an issue to be left solely to the national jurisdiction of individual states. These rights obviously need protection at a higher level within the framework of international law. If the principal aim of society is to protect individuals in the enjoyment of what Blackstone termed "absolute rights," then it follows that the aim of human laws should serve to promote and guard these rights,
As the World Coordinator rightly pointed out, this morning's trial dramatically exposed the dilemma faced by the sovereign state. While advocating human rights and even proclaiming them as a "common standard of achievement," as does the Preamble to the Universal Declaration of human Rights, it prosecutes blindly – as the spokesman for the French Government so vividly revealed – a stateless person who, to provide a legitimate framework for his own rights, was obliged to found his own government.
I wholly support this action as a logical corollary of 'the U.N.'s proclamation of' the Universal Declaration of Human Rights.
If we accept the legitimacy of individual choice in political matters-which is, after all, the essence of democracy-then the legitimacy of a world government chosen by millions of ordinary citizens cannot be in doubt. What began as a declaration of intent on December 10, 1948 has been slowly evolving into a global compact, a set of rules that proscribe and prescribe the behavior of governments toward their citizens.
There exists today a codified body of international human rights laws that include conventions and covenants on genocide, civil and political, economic and social rights, refugees' and women's rights and racial discrimination. The inter-national community is currently working on instruments to prevent torture, to protect the rights of children and to assure the freedom of religion.
While these instruments are not self-enforcing, they do provide means for holding governments accountable. They lead inevitably to this assembly today, We are the citizens concerned, We are the ultimate arbiters of human rights as they are innate and inalienable . Our action today in founding a new court to which the single world citizen can appeal falls within the historical evolution of law itself as an evolving institution.
After all, the standards and norms enumerated and outlined in international human rights instruments have not been imposed on any of the nations that are party to then. They are, instead, obligations that governments, having assumed freely and voluntarily, cannot afford to abrogate or disregard under any pretext.
The World Court of Human Rights, while not operating under any written world constitution, nonetheless can embody a "world bill of rights" which defines guarantees relating to deprivation of life, inhumane treatment, slavery and forced labor, personal liberty, determination of rights, including procedural safeguards in criminal cases, freedom of conscience, expression, peaceable assembly and movement, freedom from discrimination and prohibition against compulsory acquisition of property without adequate compensation.
Indeed the very enunciation and acceptance of these basic human rights implies due process to insure their implementation and punishment to their violators. Such was the premise of the Nuremberg Court. No written world constitution sanctioned the Nuremberg Principles. Yet they were effectively used by the Allies to charge, convict and condemn those accused of the international crimes of war planning, war-making and genocide.

Before this assembly, I pledge my best and most devoted endeavors as Chief Justice of the World Court of Human Rights in the service of the oppressed, the persecuted and the downtrodden. It has been said that the guarantees of personal liberty and impartial justice are the first casualties of a so-called national emergency. Civil courts are too often replaced by military tribunals and the writ of habeas corpus is usually suspended. Inevitably the despicable use of preventive detention replaces the constitutional guarantees of personal liberty. The citizenry then is made to live in a perpetual state of emergency. When that happens, the state becomes an end in itself, a mere summation of the individuals within it.
The World Government of World Citizens that you here represent, is the only effective counter- balance to national citizenry becoming national servitude due to suppression of civil liberties in the name of national security and public order.
Now the newly declared World Court of Human Rights will take its place as a needful addition to provide a legal refuge. a global asylum, as it were, to our fellow citizens everywhere.
I profoundly believe this day's work has the blessings of the Almighty. Thank you.

Notes and references

1908 births
1993 deaths
Lawyers from Chicago
University of Chicago Law School alumni
Illinois lawyers
20th-century American lawyers
Federal Bureau of Investigation informants